Chadalawada Krishnamurthy  (born 1 May 1948) is an Indian politician and social activist. He was an MLA in Andhra Pradesh Legislative Assembly from Tirupati assembly constituency. He  was a Chairman of Tirumala Tirupati Devasthanam (TTD) Board of Trustees. He belongs to the Balija social community.

Early life
Chadalawada Krishnamurthy was born on 1 May 1948 in Chennur village of  Nellore district. He was born to Venkata Subbanna and Venkata Ramanamma. His native village is Naidu Peta of Nellore District. He is a Post graduate with Doctorate in MA. He is Chairman of Chadalavada Charitable Trust to serve the needy.

Political career
As he evinced interest in politics 1973 with an influence of late Mrs. Indira Gandhi policies and programmes to serve the people of his nation. He was youth congress president for Nellore district in the period of 1976 to 1977 under the leadership of Sri Sanjay Gandhi. He was elected surpanch for Naidupeta Major Gram panchayat in 1981 elections. During this tenure with  keen interest in the developmental activities of all the developments have been positioned in that place. The Govt. awarded best surpanch of the state award in the year 1983 for the development evidenced. His deep attachment in public service then elected as General Secretary for APCC. He applied ticket for assembly election from the Tirupati Assembly constituency in 1994 elections, the main reasons for selecting this place, his native constituency comes under reserved category, Tirupati is well placed with key reputation and he has his social service activities of free drinking water supply to needy people and also free medical treatment with permanently established centre and also very much attached to his native place. But the high command issued the ticket from Srikalahasti constituency, as an acme follower of the Late Sri Rajiv Gandhi vision for the nation. He obeyed the orders of high command and contested the elections from the Srikalahasti constituency with congress ticket. He lost in the elections very narrow margin of 1580 votes. He requested ticket again from Tirupati in 1999 elections but the high command again dismayed his request for Tirupati and instructed to contest from Srikalahasti constituency. Even though zenith follower and fervent supporter of Congress parties policies and the hallucination of late Sri Rajiv Gandhi’s to secure the rights of the poor and the underprivileged of the nation, obeyed/preferred to the demand of the Tirupati constituency public to contest in the elections.  Then he was given prime magnitude to the general public demand and joined in the TDP at that point of time and contested the election, 1999 Andhra Pradesh Legislative Assembly election and elected as MLA with thumping majority of 15000 votes. In his tenure, as a MLA in Tirupati, all the developmental activities evidenced very significantly in entire constituency. The general public is very much satisfied with the way of participation for unprecedented development of this area in very short span. A blast and its shock when he escaped an attempt on his life as following along with Chief Minister N. Chandrababu Naidu planted by the People's War activists triggered a series of nine powerful Claymore mines, which they are suspected to have planted over a period of time on the ghat road leading to the Tirumala hills from Tirupati.

Political postings
The Andhra Pradesh Government on 27 April 2015 appointed Chadalavada Krishnamurthy as the Chairman of Tirumala Tirupati Devasthanam (TTD) Board of Trustees, a body which administers Tirupati's Lord Venkateswara temple for his  dedication, application and determination towards public services.

Social services
It is his privilege to serving the people of Tirupati, Srikalahasti and Naidupet Constituencies general public with social work of rendering the free service to the needy people in Government departments whenever necessary and extending  support to the poor people with Medical and Educational facilities. He established one permanent Dental hospital in Tirupathi to serve the people free of cost for their treatment and also distributing the pension for old age people and performed several times mass marriages with own expenses. He is supplying free drinking water to the BPL people of the Tirupathi and the Naidu pet towns since twenty years with own infrastructure at their door steps.

References

1948 births
Living people
Members of the Andhra Pradesh Legislative Assembly
Telugu Desam Party politicians
People from Nellore district
Telugu politicians